Abbotts Dyke is a dyke located in Argyle Head, Nova Scotia.

It carries the Crowelltown Road across an inlet of the Argyle River estuary.

Geography of Yarmouth County
Dikes in Canada